Geranyl pyrophosphate (GPP), also known as geranyl diphosphate (GDP), is the pyrophosphate ester of the terpenoid geraniol.  Its salts are colorless.  It is a precursor to many natural products.

Occurrence
GPP is an intermediate in the isoprenoid biosynthesis pathway that produces longer prenyl chains such as farnesyl pyrophosphate and geranylgeranyl pyrophosphate as well as many terpenes.  It can be prepared in the laboratory from geraniol.

Related compounds
 Geraniol
 Farnesyl pyrophosphate
 Geranylgeranyl pyrophosphate

See also
 Dimethylallyltranstransferase

References

Further reading
Kulkarni RS, Pandit SS, Chidley HG, Nagel R, Schmidt A, Gershenzon J, Pujari KH, Giri AP and Gupta VS, 2013, Characterization of three novel isoprenyl diphosphate synthases from the terpenoid rich mango fruit. Plant Physiology and Biochemistry, 71, 121–131.

Organophosphates
Monoterpenes